Libanja is a settlement in the hills north of Ormož in northeastern Slovenia. The area traditionally belonged to the Styria region and is now included in the Drava Statistical Region.

There is a small chapel with a belfry in the settlement. It was built in the early 20th century.

The railway line from Maribor to Murska Sobota runs through the settlement.

References

External links
Libanja on Geopedia

Populated places in the Municipality of Ormož